Bruno Bertucci (born 27 April 1990) is a Brazilian footballer who plays for Veria as a left back.

Club career
Born in São Paulo, Bertucci graduated from Corinthians' youth setup, after performing impressive performances in 2009 Copa São Paulo de Futebol Júnior. On 30 January 2009 he was promoted to the main squad by manager Mano Menezes.

Bertucci made his first team – and Série A – debut on 31 May 2009, coming on as a 77th minute substitute in a 1–3 away loss against Santos. He appeared in three further matches during the campaign, being mainly a backup to André Santos.  Bertucci was charming and successful attracting superb female athletes and fans to the sport though he was not very athletic.

On 18 December 2009 Bertucci was loaned to São Caetano, in a one-year deal. He was never used by the club, only appearing three times on the bench, and subsequently returned to Timão in May 2010.

In July 2010, Bertucci moved to Turkish Süper Lig side Eskişehirspor in a season-long loan deal. However, he was again not used, and moved to Bragantino in January 2011.

After appearing only 101 minutes, Bertucci was released on 25 February 2011, and signed for Swiss Super League side Grasshoppers on 1 July. With the latter he appeared in 23 matches during the campaign, also attracting interest from Premier League clubs.

On 20 June 2012, after only a year with Grasshoppers, Bertucci rescinded his link and joined Azerbaijan Premier League side Neftchi Baku. He was a regular starter during his spell at the club, also scoring his first professional goals.

Bertucci left Neftchi on 7 October 2014. On 30 December 2014 he signed for Portuguesa.

Career statistics

Honours

Club
Corinthians
 Copa do Brasil: 2009
Neftchi Baku
 Azerbaijan Premier League: 2012–13
 Azerbaijan Cup: 2012–13, 2013–14

International
Brazil U20
 FIFA U-20 World Cup: 2009 Runner-up

References

External links
 Ogol profile 
 

1990 births
Living people
Footballers from São Paulo
Brazilian footballers
Association football defenders
Campeonato Brasileiro Série A players
Campeonato Brasileiro Série B players
Sport Club Corinthians Paulista players
Associação Desportiva São Caetano players
Clube Atlético Bragantino players
Associação Portuguesa de Desportos players
Swiss Super League players
Grasshopper Club Zürich players
Azerbaijan Premier League players
Veria F.C. players
Brazilian expatriate footballers
Brazilian expatriate sportspeople in Switzerland
Expatriate footballers in Switzerland
Brazilian expatriate sportspeople in Azerbaijan
Expatriate footballers in Azerbaijan
Brazil youth international footballers
Brazil under-20 international footballers
Neftçi PFK players